The Grand Prize of the Danish Academy, founded in 1961, is the most notable of Denmark's literature prizes and awards. It is awarded by the Danish Academy. Until 1982, it was handed yearly, but since then it has been given every second year. The first years the prize was 50.000 DKK. In 1982 the Cultural Ministry of Denmark increased the prize to 100.000 DKK. From 1992 to 1997 it was 200.000 DKK, in 1998 it was 250.000 DKK and since 2000 it has been 300.000 DKK. The prize is a recognition of a writers work as a whole and not only for one book.

Recipients of the Grand Prize of the Danish Academy 
 1961 Knuth Becker
 1962 Villy Sørensen
 1963 Jens August Schade
 1964 Jacob Paludan
 1965 Erik Knudsen
 1966 Klaus Rifbjerg
 1967 Ole Sarvig
 1968 Tom Kristensen
 1969 Frank Jæger
 1970 Ivan Malinowski
 1971 Leif Panduro
 1972 Svend Åge Madsen
 1973 Hans Scherfig
 1974 Sven Holm
 1975 Carl Erik Soya
 1976 Jørgen Sonne
 1977 Peter Seeberg
 1978 Tage Skou-Hansen
 1979 Poul Vad
 1980 Henrik Nordbrandt
 1981 Dorrit Willumsen
 1982 Per Højholt
 1984 Jess Ørnsbo
 1986 Henrik Stangerup
 1988 Halfdan Rasmussen
 1990 Jens Smærup Sørensen
 1992 Peter Laugesen
 1994 Ib Michael
 1996 Vibeke Grønfeldt
 1998 Cecil Bødker
 2000 Kirsten Thorup
 2002 Vagn Lundbye
 2004 Peer Hultberg 
 2006 Bent Vinn Nielsen
 2008 F.P. Jac
 2010 Jørn Riel
 2012 Thomas Boberg
 2014 Knud Sørensen
 2016 Helle Helle
 2018 Christina Hesselholdt
 2020 Naja Marie Aidt

References

External links 
 List of recipients of the Grand Prize on Litteraturpriser.dk

Danish literary awards
1961 establishments in Denmark